Punta Cana International Airport  is a privately owned commercial airport in Punta Cana, eastern Dominican Republic. The airport was built with open-air terminals and roofs covered in palm fronds. Grupo Punta Cana built the airport, which was designed by architect Oscar Imbert, and inaugurated it in December 1983. It is owned by Grupo Punta Cana and became the first privately owned international airport in the world.

The airport is the busiest in the Dominican Republic, and the second-busiest of the Caribbean, only behind Puerto Rico's Luis Muñoz Marín International Airport. In 2018, more than 7.8 million passengers (arrivals and departures combined) passed through the terminals that year, with almost 50,000 commercial aircraft operations. In 2014, the airport accounted for 60% of all air arrivals in the Dominican Republic. The airport serves 90 airports in 26 countries.

History

Beginnings 
The history of aviation in the Punta Cana region started in 1971, when Grupo Puntacana built the first hotel in the area, called "Punta Cana Club", along with a small airstrip. There were no terminals and no runway; it was just a flat piece of land. The only problem was that the area was very secluded from the rest of the Dominican Republic. Also, many more people were starting to go to Punta Cana for vacation, with more and more small cabins being built. Since there were no roads nor harbors, the only way to get into Punta Cana was by air.

In the late 1970s a road was built to connect the area with the capital of La Altagracia Province, Higüey. Tourists from various countries started to come in. They had to pass through Las Américas International Airport in Santo Domingo, then take a short flight in a small plane to Punta Cana. The airstrip itself had significant problems, such as having a very short runway and still no terminal. This meant passengers would exit their plane and be directed onto a road to be picked up to ride to their hotel, which was inconvenient. Grupo PuntaCana knew it needed a real airport.

Planning and construction 

In late 1974, Grupo Puntacana started to plan the first private international airport. However, the local government disapproved of the new airport. After eight full years of arguing with the province, a contract was made to begin construction on the new airport. The airport would be built where the old airstrip stood. In early 1981 planning started on the airport.  Oscar Imbert (son of General Antonio Imbert) was chosen as architect. He wanted the terminal architecture to be based on Native American Tainos and Arawak structures. At the same time, he wanted to give the passengers a paradise feeling. The problem was that the planners did not want to pay for expensive air conditioning. The solution to this problem was to build the terminal in such a way that the coastal breezes from the Caribbean Sea would come in and cool down the passengers. The terminal building was planned to have palm fronds for the roof, and stone from the nearby jungles for the walls. For the columns, they would use eucalyptus logs and build them in Taíno and Arawak styles.

Construction on the new airport started in early 1982, and the small airstrip had to close down.  To substitute for the loss, a small concrete airstrip was made into a temporary airport.  This strip would turn into a runway when the airport opened.  Since the terminal was small and there was not a lot of construction needed, the terminal was completed in under four months. The runway and tarmac took a long time since there were not many construction workers building the airport. The area was secluded, which dissuaded many construction workers from trying to build the airport. However, after eight years of persuading the government, and two more years of construction, the airport began operations on 17 December 1983.

1980s 
The airport started out with a  runway, which could fit larger propeller planes. The small control tower also began operation.

In January 1984, Punta Cana had its first international flight from San Juan, Puerto Rico,  operated by the Puerto Rican airline, Prinair. The aircraft was a small double turbo propeller aircraft with 20 passengers. In 1984, the airport received 2,976 passengers.

With a proper airport, many new hotels were built. As a result, this brought an increased demand to bring jet aircraft to Punta Cana, since the airport would have to accommodate more people. This led to the airport's first expansion in 1986. The tarmac was also expanded to accommodate jet aircraft, and the control tower had new radar systems added to it. This expansion allowed many more aircraft to land at the airport. In 1987, the first route between Punta Cana and the United States began, with Miami International Airport.

During this time, new airlines from around the Caribbean started to fly here. There were only about four airlines in 1988. All of these small airlines were regional, coming from different parts of the Caribbean. The second expansion was added in 1988, with the addition of a new taxiway. In 1989, the first private jets started to fly to the airport. This expansion was completed in late 1990.

1990s 

The 1990s brought a major change to the airport. Now that the runway was 10,171 feet (3,100 m), long-haul jets could fly there. Some of the first airlines to fly charters to Punta Cana during this time were Monarch Airlines and Air Belgium in 1990 and 1991, respectively. Condor was expanding rapidly, following the addition of their new Boeing 767s and one of its new destinations from Frankfurt was Punta Cana.

These became the first routes from Europe and the first long-haul routes in the airport's history.  Around the same time, LTU International started a route from Berlin. Many airlines around the Caribbean stopped operations to the airport, as a result of the new long-haul flights. In 1993, the airline Hapag-Lloyd Flug began a route from Düsseldorf.  Air Transat began a route from Montréal, which became the first route from Canada.  In 1994, American Airlines started operations to Miami International Airport.  The same year, Lauda Air began operations from Vienna.  The Dutch wanted a route to Punta Cana, so in January 1995, Martinair began operations from Amsterdam Schiphol. ATA Airlines started to fly to Midway International Airport in early 1996. In October 1996, the Chilean airline Lan Chile began to fly 767s from Bogota and Santiago.

Over time, more airlines from Europe, Canada, and the US began operations to Punta Cana. The late 1990s saw many new European charter carriers such as Britannia Airways, Air Europe, and Iberworld. There was increasing demand for an expansion, as the tarmac was not big enough to fit all of the new jet aircraft. This was becoming a major problem, as new airlines could not introduce new routes unless the airport expanded.

Towards the end of 1998, the tarmac was extremely busy and dangerous, due to aircraft having to taxi down the runway and turn before departure. The need to backtaxi created dangerous conditions with the volume of traffic, and sometimes resulted in considerable delays as other aircraft waited to enter the runway. The rapid growth of the airport's route network was too excessive for the small airport. As the number of passengers grew, Grupo PuntaCana planned a massive expansion, which began in 1999.

2000s 
A long taxiway was added to prevent a collision on the runway, and the tarmac was expanded to fit six aircraft. This expansion was completed in 2001, and airline growth continued.

During this time, Punta Cana was drastically changing, with the addition of new hotels, malls, and infrastructure. Many people were flying to Punta Cana annually, and once again the airport was crowded by 2002. A new parking lot was built along with the new PuntaCana Village. By 2003, there was a small expansion of the terminal and the tarmac was expanded to allow seven aircraft to park. This was also the year the Grupo Puntacana had begun the planning of a second runway.

In 2004, Terminal 2 opened, the second terminal at the airport. As many old charter carriers from the 1990s began to cease operations to the airport, each new year brought new airlines and destinations. Several prominent leisure carriers such as Transaero, Pullmantur Air, and Corsairfly started operations with large aircraft such as the Boeing 747.

2010s 
In 2011, a new second runway was opened, which permitted more long-haul flights from countries like France, England, and Brazil with large planes such as the Boeing 747-400, the Boeing 777, and the Airbus A340. With this expansion, the airport became the first in the Caribbean to have two runways longer than 10,000 feet. Along with the new runway, a new control tower, Terminal Approach Radar Control facility and a new Automated Weather Observation Station (AWOS) were all presented.

In November 2014, Terminal B was officially inaugurated. This terminal uses jet bridges, the first terminal at the airport to use them. The new terminal is also completely enclosed, unlike the other terminals at the airport.

In November 2017, a new VIP lounge opened, which included a pool.

Facilities

Terminals

The airport has five terminals:

 International Terminals A and B - international commercial passenger travel
 FBO Terminal - executive general aviation
 National Terminal - serves national charter and general aviation flights
 VIP Terminal - private terminal including an aircraft parking apron

Terminal A, the older terminal of the two international terminals, uses aircraft stairs for passengers to deplane and board aircraft with access for disabled people using wheelchair lifts. Terminal B was built with seven airbridges, three being for wide-body aircraft. This new terminal was completed in 2014 and can comfortably accommodate 6,500 travelers daily and over 2 million travelers annually.

U.S. preclearance
Plans were underway for a U.S. Customs and Border Protection preclearance station to be opened at the airport by the end of summer 2009; however, this has not yet begun. According to Frank Rainieri, president of Grupo Puntacana, negotiations have re-opened (as of June 2015) and he anticipates that this airport will be the first in Latin America to offer such preclearance service. As of December 2020, the preclearance station is still planned, but is waiting to receive authorization from the Dominican Government to begin construction.

Airlines and destinations

Statistics

Accidents and incidents 

 On May 22, 2005, a Skyservice 767-300 suffered from a fracture in the upper fuselage and damaged landing gear after experiencing a hard landing and bouncing multiple times following a flight from Toronto. There were a few injuries but no fatalities among the 318 occupants of the aircraft and it was repaired and returned to service.
 On October 13, 2014, the engine of a Jetstream Bae 32 aircraft belonging to Air Century Airlines caught fire while landing after a charter flight from Luis Muñoz Marín International Airport in San Juan, Puerto Rico. The airplane crew declared an emergency and landed the aircraft at 20:45 local time, after a 49-minute flight, but the plane was destroyed in a subsequent fire. There were no injuries among the 13 passengers and two crew members.
 On February 10, 2016, Orenair flight 554 to Moscow Domodedovo Airport reported an engine fire and smoke in the cabin. The crew decided to turn around and land the aircraft, without dumping fuel, rather circling around the airport. Upon landing the overweight aircraft, the landing gear overheated and caught fire, and the aircraft was evacuated. There were no injuries among the 371 occupants of the Boeing 777 and it remained grounded at the airport for 10 months, leaving in December 2016.

See also 
 List of the busiest airports in Dominican Republic
 List of the busiest airports in the Caribbean
 Tourism

References

External links 

 

Buildings and structures in La Altagracia Province
Airports in the Dominican Republic
Airports established in 1983
1932 establishments in the Dominican Republic
Privately owned airports